Carlos Rendón Zipagauta (Cali, 29 September 1955) is a Colombian-Belgian documentary filmmaker. Rendón Zipagauta studied film and screenwriting in Belgium, where he lived for 16 years. He began as assistant then co-director to Jean Christophe Lamy. He returned to Colombia to shoot documentaries. His 1993 film Nukak Makú, about the indigenous Nukak peoples, won festival prizes in France and Belgium enabling also EU grants to make further documentaries.

Returning to Colombia Rendón Zipagauta has taught cinema at the University of Santa Magdalena since 2004, and teaches French at the Alliance Française of Santa Marta.

Filmography (Director)
Documentaries
 1991 : Salseros, on Cali's salsa music 
 1992 : Tamalameque, on the town Tamalameque  
 1993 : Nukak Makú, on the indigenous Nukak people of Colombia 
 1997 : Ciénaga Grande on the grand swamps  
 1998 : Charanguita
 2004 : Porteur d'eau produced by Scarfilm
 2007 : Biblioburro, on Biblioburro The Donkey Library

Screenwriter
 1988 : P.O.V., TV series

References

External links

 Vimeo

1955 births
Living people
Colombian film directors
Belgian documentary film directors